With Shaking Hands is an American Christian hardcore and Christian metal band, and they primarily play electronicore and screamo. They are from Fort Worth, Texas. The band started making music in 2010. The band released, an extended play, Armor of Light, in 2012, with PHM Records.

Background
With Shaking Hands is a Christian hardcore and Christian metal band from Fort Worth, Texas. Their members are lead vocalist, Tyler Dixon, background vocalist and guitarist, Matt Gulick, guitarist, Russell Mertz, bassist, Brody Pempsell, and drummer, Aaron Gavaldon.

Music history
The band commenced as a musical entity in 2010, with their first release, Armor of Light, an extended play, that was released on June 10, 2012, with PHM Records.

Members
Current members
 Tyler Dixon - vocals
 Matt Gulick - guitar, backing vocals
 Russell Mertz - guitar
 Brody Pempsell - bass
 Aaron Gavaldon - drums

Discography
EPs
 Armor of Light (June 10, 2012, PHM)

References

External links
Official website

Musical groups from Texas
2010 establishments in Texas
Musical groups established in 2009